John Fair "Jocko" Marcellino (born May 12, 1950) is an American singer, musician, songwriter, producer and actor best known as one of the founders of the American rock and roll group Sha Na Na. He performed with Sha Na Na at the original Woodstock Festival, in the movie Grease and on their eponymous syndicated TV show.

Early life and Education
Marcellino was born in Quincy, Massachusetts, and raised in Braintree, the fifth of six children. His younger sister is Noella Marcellino.

He began drumming at age 7 and formed his first band, The Miltones from Milton, Massachusetts, at age 13.  At 17, he joined The Pilgrims with saxophonist Lennie Baker, whom he later recruited for Sha Na Na.

He was also an all conference and all state football player at Archbishop Williams High School in Braintree.

He attended Columbia University as member of the class of 1972.

Marcellino earned a B.A. from Columbia University and later a master's degree in drama from New York University.

Sha Na Na 
During his freshman year at the age of 19, a group of students and Marcellino formed Sha Na Na. In the summer of 1969, Marcellino performed with Sha Na Na at Woodstock, only the group's eighth performance.

Marcellino continued to tour with Sha Na Na, along with co-founder Donny York and long-term member Screamin' Scott Simon. Sha Na Na announced they would no longer tour on December 5, 2022. He also tours with his side rhythm and blues band "Jocko and the Rockets".

Acting 

Marcellino's acting credits include television's Veronica Mars, NYPD Blue, Ally McBeal, The Tiger Woods Story, Herman's Head, Good Advice, 18 Wheels of Justice, The Invisible Man, Amazing Stories, and It's Garry Shandling's Show.

He also acted in the films Rain Man, National Security and Hot to Trot. Marcellino has also written and performed songs for the films Rain Man, That's Life and Night of the Comet; and television shows Law & Order: Special Victims Unit, The Office, Terriers, Castle, Kath & Kim, Parks and Recreation, Golden Boy, Once Upon a Time and ESPN's Monday Countdown.

Personal life
He lives with his wife in La Jolla, California.

References

External links

Jocko Marcellino Interview - NAMM Oral History Library (2016)

1950 births
Living people
Sha Na Na members
Tisch School of the Arts alumni
People from Quincy, Massachusetts
Musicians from Massachusetts
People from Braintree, Massachusetts
American actors
Songwriters from Massachusetts
People from La Jolla, San Diego
Columbia College (New York) alumni
New York University alumni